"Higher" is a 1996 song by Cuban American singer and songwriter Gloria Estefan. It was released as the fourth single from her seventh studio album, Destiny (1996). The song was released a double-side single along with "I'm Not Giving You Up" in the US and Canada, but in other countries was a solely single. The music video made for the song is not available as the original version album, only as the "Big Red Video Remix" in the video Don't Stop!. When performed live at some concerts song, the song is mixed with Estefan's smash Latin hit "Tres Deseos".

Critical reception
AllMusic editor Stephen Thomas Erlewine wrote in his review of Destiny, that the song rank with Estefan's finest work, with the other album tracks "Reach" and "I'm Not Giving You Up". Larry Flick from Billboard described it as a "festive street-party anthem". The magazine's Paul Verna viewed it as an "anti-drug anthem". Daina Darzin from Cash Box picked it as a "standout" of the album, noting its "ferocious salsa beat". The Daily Vault's Mark Millan called it a "chill-out groove", "which is just as much fun but not as noisy" like "You'll Be Mine (Party Time)". He stated that it "add much needed light into what is a very mood-driven and introspective collection of songs." A reviewer from People Magazine stated that "her sensual vocal style works best when it rides a firecracker groove." The reviewer added that "when she gets wild and frisky in the congo stomp of "Higher", Estefan can even get a grandma leaping from her rocking chair and dancing into the streets." Fernando Gonzales from Star-News viewed it as a "good-time romp".

Charts

References

1996 singles
1997 singles
Gloria Estefan songs
1996 songs
Songs written by Lawrence Dermer
Epic Records singles
Song recordings produced by Emilio Estefan